Jon Kreamelmeyer (born 1947) is an American cross-country skiing coach and a member of the Paralympic Hall of Fame.

Early life and career
Kreamelmeyer was born and raised in Colorado. He graduated from Dakota Wesleyan University with a degree in Education and began teaching at Summit County High School in Frisco, Colorado, where he served as assistant ski coach from 1977 until 1986 and the head ski coach until 1991.

From 1996 to 2002, Kreamelmeyer served on the Frisco Town Council and in 2003 was elected to the Summit School District Board of Education. He remained on the board until 2011, serving terms as vice president and president. In 2012, he was recognised for his contributions to the community with a Frisco Finest award.

Paralympics

At the 1992 Winter Paralympics, held in Tignes and Albertville, France, Kreamelmeyer acted as the sighted guide for blind skier Michele Drolet in cross-country skiing events. The pair finished fifth in the women's long distance 10 km B1, in a time of one hour 10 minutes 6.8 seconds and sixth in the women's short distance 5 km B1 in 25 minutes 58.4 seconds.

He competed at his second Paralympic Games in 1994 in Lillehammer, Norway, where he again acted as the sighted guide for Drolet. They finished fifth in both the 5 km and 10 km classical technique B1 events, before winning a bronze medal in the 5 km free technique B1. Drolet finished in a time of 20 minutes 8.7 seconds and became the first American woman to win a Paralympic or Olympic medal in cross-country skiing.

He was named assistant coach of the United States Paralympic Cross-country Skiing Team in 1995. He became head coach from 1998 until 2006, during which time the United States won 11 Paralympic medals in cross-country skiing. After leaving his position as head coach he continued to be involved with the United States Olympic Committee s a development coach.

In February 2014, during the Winter Paralympics held in Sochi, Russia, Kreamelmeyer was inducted into the Paralympic Hall of Fame alongside visually impaired skiers Eric Villalon Fuentes from Spain and Verena Bentele from Germany.

References

1947 births
Sportspeople from Colorado
Living people
Dakota Wesleyan University alumni
Cross-country skiers at the 1992 Winter Paralympics
Cross-country skiers at the 1994 Winter Paralympics
American male cross-country skiers